Katarina Živković (born 2 July 1989) is a Serbian Pop-folk singer and television personality from Leskovac. She rose to prominence as a contestant on the singing competition show Zvezde Granda in 2007. Her debut album, titled Ludo srce, was released in 2013.

Živković won the third series of the Serbian reality television show Farma (2010) with 54% of public votes, receiving the cash prize of €100,000.

Discography
Studio albums
Ludo srce (2013)
Porok (2017)

Filmography

References

External links

1989 births
Living people
Musicians from Leskovac
 Serbian folk-pop singers
Serbian folk singers
21st-century Serbian women singers
Serbian turbo-folk singers
Grand Production artists